Sacred Heart College, Chalakudy is an aided college in Chalakudy, Kerala, India, which was established in 1980. It was established as a junior college with pre-degree courses, and was upgraded to a first grade status in 1991 and is presently offering eight Under Graduate and six post-graduate courses. The college is located in a peaceful semi urban locality, the lush green gardens and well designed infrastructure provide the perfect ambience for learning, sharing and development of the students. 

The college is managed by the Alvernia province of Franciscan Clarist Congregation and is affiliated to the University of Calicut. The students and the alumni of the college call themselves 'Sacred Heartians' and the campus in short as 'SHC'.

External links

References

Franciscan universities and colleges
Catholic universities and colleges in India
Colleges in Kerala
Universities and colleges in Thrissur district
Educational institutions established in 1980
1980 establishments in Kerala
Education in Chalakudy
Buildings and structures in Chalakudy